= Moira Steyn-Ross =

New Zealand physics academic

Moira L. Steyn-Ross
- Education: University of Waikato
- Scientific career
- Fields: Physics, modelled of biological systems
- Workplaces: University of Waikato
- Thesis: The quantum theory of optical bistability in nonlinear systems (1981)

Moira L. Steyn-Ross is a New Zealand physics academic. She is currently a full professor at the University of Waikato.

== Academic career ==
After a 1981 PhD titled 'The quantum theory of optical bistability in nonlinear systems' at the University of Waikato, she joined staff, rising to full professor. Much of Steyn-Ross's research has been into the effect of anaesthesia.
